District is a type of administrative division in some countries managed by a local government.

District may also refer to:

District, an alternative term for neighbourhood
 Central business district (sometimes called the "financial district"), in large cities
 Electoral district, a territorial subdivision for holding elections
 Congressional district, an electoral district in the United States
 District (LDS Church), geographical division for The Church of Jesus Christ of Latter-day Saints
District (EP), an EP by Sponge Cola
School District
Shopping district, an area with many stores, in small cities or other municipalities

See also
The District (disambiguation)
Lake District
District line, part of the London Underground

Subdistrict